Robbie Buchanan (born 23 February 1996) is a Scottish footballer who plays as a forward for Cowdenbeath.

Career

Heart of Midlothian
Born in Blantyre, South Lanarkshire, Buchanan joined Heart of Midlothian aged 13, having been released by Rangers. He was first included in a matchday squad on 31 August 2013, remaining an unused substitute for their 3–0 loss at Inverness Caledonian Thistle.

He made his debut on 20 August 2014 in the second round of the Scottish Challenge Cup away to Livingston, replacing Gary Oliver in the 56th minute of a 4–1 loss. On 26 October, he made his professional debut in the Scottish Championship, replacing Billy King for the final three minutes of a 1–1 Edinburgh derby draw with Hibernian at Easter Road. On 5 May 2015, Buchanan signed a new two-year contract. Buchanan eventually left the club at the end of the 2016–17 season, following the end of his contract.

Loan moves
Buchanan was loaned to fellow Scottish Championship team Cowdenbeath on 16 January 2015, playing 10 games without scoring, as the season ended with relegation.

He returned to Cowdenbeath, now of Scottish League One, on 7 August, and his loan ended at the start of November 2015.

In November 2016, Buchanan joined Brechin City on a one-month emergency loan deal, in a bid to strengthen their squad. On 31 January 2017, Buchanan joined Cowdenbeath for his third spell on loan at the Fife club, this time in Scottish League Two, until the end of the season.

Cowdenbeath
After leaving Hearts, Buchanan joined Cowdenbeath on 3 July 2017 for his fourth spell with the club, this time on a permanent contract. He left the club at the end of the  2021-22 season following Cowdenbeath's relegation from the  Football League.

Pollok
In June 2022, he signed for  WoSFL side  Pollok.

Career statistics

References

External links
 

1996 births
Living people
Scottish footballers
Association football forwards
Heart of Midlothian F.C. players
Cowdenbeath F.C. players
Brechin City F.C. players
Scottish Professional Football League players
People from Blantyre, South Lanarkshire